Eidson Road is a census-designated place (CDP) in Maverick County, Texas, United States. The population was 8,960 at the 2010 census.

Geography
Eidson Road is located at  (28.674215, -100.483153).

Demographics

2020 census

As of the 2020 United States census, there were 9,461 people, 2,486 households, and 2,012 families residing in the CDP.

2000 census
As of the census of 2000, there were 9,348 people, 2,232 households, and 2,077 families residing in the CDP. The population density was 1,315.2 people per square mile (507.6/km2). There were 2,583 housing units at an average density of 363.4/sq mi (140.3/km2). The racial makeup of the CDP was 76.48% White, 0.39% African American, 0.67% Native American, 0.04% Asian, 19.39% from other races, and 3.03% from two or more races. Hispanic or Latino of any race were 98.44% of the population.

There were 2,232 households, out of which 61.3% had children under the age of 18 living with them, 76.2% were married couples living together, 13.7% had a female householder with no husband present, and 6.9% were non-families. 6.3% of all households were made up of individuals, and 3.0% had someone living alone who was 65 years of age or older. The average household size was 4.19 and the average family size was 4.38.

In the CDP, the population was spread out, with 40.9% under the age of 18, 10.4% from 18 to 24, 26.8% from 25 to 44, 16.1% from 45 to 64, and 5.9% who were 65 years of age or older. The median age was 24 years. For every 100 females, there were 94.3 males. For every 100 females age 18 and over, there were 91.8 males.

The median income for a household in the CDP was $19,355, and the median income for a family was $20,327. Males had a median income of $18,393 versus $13,212 for females. The per capita income for the CDP was $6,115. About 39.4% of families and 41.7% of the population were below the poverty line, including 49.5% of those under age 18 and 41.0% of those age 65 or over.

Education
Eidson Road is served by the Eagle Pass Independent School District.

References

Census-designated places in Maverick County, Texas
Census-designated places in Texas